Take a Deep Breath is the second full-length album by Canadian band, Brighton Rock. The album was released in 1988. Take a Deep Breath is Brighton Rock's most commercially successful album, peaking at #22 on the Canadian album chart. The album was also certified Gold by the CRIA.  Gerry McGhee announced on April 30, 2013 that Take a Deep Breath will be remastered by Warner Records.

Track listing
All songs by Gerry McGhee and Greg Fraser, except where indicated.

"Can't Stop the Earth from Shaking" - 4:28
"Outlaw" - 4:57
"Hangin' High 'N' Dry" (McGhee, Fraser, Johnny Rogers) - 3:54
"One More Try" (McGhee, Rogers) - 3:53
"Ride the Rainbow" - 4:19
"Rebels With a Cause" - 4:21
"Power Overload" (Greg Boileau, McGhee, Fraser) - 4:18
"Who's Foolin' Who" - 4:21
"Love Slips Away" - 4:13
"Shootin' for Love" - 4:03
"Unleash the Rage" - 5:13

Personnel
Brighton Rock
Gerry McGhee – vocals
Greg Fraser – guitars
Steve Skreebs – bass guitar
Johnny Rogers – keyboards
Mark Cavarzan – drums

Production
Jack Richardson – producer
Andrew Scarth – mixing

Charts

Album

Singles

References

External links
 Brighton Rock official website
 RPM Charts

1988 albums
Albums produced by Jack Richardson (record producer)
Brighton Rock (band) albums
Warner Music Group albums